End of Suffering is the third studio album by British punk rock band Frank Carter & The Rattlesnakes. It was released on 3 May 2019 through International Death Cult.

Critical reception

 Loudwire named it one of the 50 best rock albums of 2019.

Commercial performance
The album peaked at number 4 on the UK Albums Chart and topped the UK Rock & Metal Albums Chart, spending seven weeks in the top 10 of the latter chart. End of Suffering did not enter the ARIA Albums Chart, but peaked at number 36 on the ARIA Digital Album Chart.

Track listing

Personnel
Frank Carter & the Rattlesnakes
Frank Carter – vocals, art direction
Dean Richardson – guitars, art direction 
Tom 'Tank' Barclay – bass
Gareth Grover – drums
Additional personnel
Tom Morello – guitar (track 2)
Cam Blackwood – producer, engineer, programming
Tom Visser – assistant producer, engineering, programming
Dan Moyler – engineer
Caesar Edmunds – engineer
Alex Copp – assistant engineer
Alan Moulder – mixing 
Tom Herbert – mixing assistant 
John Davis – mastering
Studio Yuck – artwork and design
Daniel Alexander Harris – photography

Charts

References

2019 albums
Frank Carter & The Rattlesnakes albums